The Hill School (commonly known as The Hill) is a coeducational preparatory boarding school located on a  campus in Pottstown, Pennsylvania, about  northwest of Philadelphia. The Hill is part of the Ten Schools Admissions Organization (TSAO). 

The school is accredited by the Middle States Association of Colleges and Schools Commission on Elementary and Secondary Schools.

History

The Hill School was founded in 1851 by the Rev. Matthew Meigs as the Family Boarding School for Boys and Young Men. However, it has been known as the Hill School since 1874.

The school opened on May 1, 1851, enrolling 25 boys for the first year. According to Paul Chancellor's The History of The Hill School: 1851-1976, “He [Meigs] wanted to stress that he was not founding still another academy, but a type of school quite new and rare in America. There is a tendency to think that the boys' boarding school as we know it existed as long as there have been private schools. It has not.... The Hill was the first to be founded as a "family boarding school" (a school where the students lived on campus), as opposed to boarding with families in the town."

In 1998, the school became coeducational, enrolling 88 girls in its first year.

Academics
In the early 20th century, The Hill was a feeder school for Princeton University; a prominent "The Hill School Club" operated at Princeton for the benefit of alumni. The prevalence of Hill alumni, as well as those of Lawrenceville, Hotchkiss, Exeter and Phillips Academy, at Princeton led F. Scott Fitzgerald to lament that it was those of 'lesser' preparatory schools which were more prepared for the fray. The admissions process was relaxed for Hill School students, with cases including George Garrett, Princeton 1952, who was admitted when he confessed that he liked the striped football uniforms. At one point, Lawrenceville and Hill sent more students to Princeton than all public schools combined.  Today, Hill alumni attend a wide variety of colleges.

The Hill School offers classes in each of its nine academic departments and offers 28 Advanced Placement courses.

Foreign languages
The Hill School offers Chinese, French, Spanish, Arabic, Latin, and Ancient Greek classes.

Partner schools
The Hill School has had a relationship with Charterhouse School in the United Kingdom since 1994 that includes instructional trips, along with exchanges of extracurricular programs and teachers. It is linked with the Maru a Pula School in Botswana. As well, the Hill hosts a Thai King's Scholar every year. The Hill School is a participating school in the Naval Academy Foundation Prep Program.

Athletics
In the early days of the school, boys played shinney, town ball, football and cricket. Matthew Meigs was not an athlete yet allowed sporting pursuits, unlike his contemporaries such as Samuel Taylor of Phillips Academy. During John Meigs' tenure as headmaster, organized and interscholastic sports began at The Hill. Tennis became the dominant sport during this period, unlike baseball at other schools.

The Hill School is a member of the Mid-Atlantic Prep League (MAPL), which the School joined in 1998. The Hill School was a charter member of the Pennsylvania Independent Schools Athletic Association (PAISAA), which became an officially sanctioned organization in 2011. In 2014, The Hill School received associate membership in the New England Preparatory School Athletic Council (NEPSAC).

The Hill School's rivalry with Lawrenceville dates back to 1887. It is the fifth-oldest high school rivalry in the United States. Originally an annual football game, the schools compete against each other in all of the fall sports on either the first or second weekend in November.

Peddie School also maintains a "Hill Day" during which several teams from Hill and Peddie compete.

Participation in athletics is considered a vital part of a Hill education. All third and fourth form students must participate in at least two seasons of interscholastic sports, and all fifth and sixth formers must play at least one interscholastic season. Students may fulfill a season requirement by serving as a student athletic trainer or team manager.

Culture

The Hill School has been described as different in style and spirit from its counterparts in New England, and has been described as strict and demanding. It has also been described as conservative.

Alumnus Oliver Stone described his experience at The Hill School: "I hated the Hill School at the time. It was monastic. Horrible food, no girls. It was truly one of those Charles Dickens' types of experiences. And I really hated it. Years later I came to appreciate it. I think the inquiry and above all the discipline, of studying and concentrating and sitting down and doing it." The Hill has been criticized, alongside other East Coast Protestant schools, for promoting "snobbish", undemocratic, and "un-American values".

E. Digby Baltzell's book The Protestant Establishment identified the Hill School as one of the "select sixteen" best boarding schools in the United States.

Notable alumni

Headmasters
Headmasters of The Hill School since its founding in 1851:

References

External links
 The Hill School
 The Association of Boarding Schools profile
 Boarding School Review
 National Center for Education Statistics data for the Hill School

 
Boarding schools in Pennsylvania
Private high schools in Pennsylvania
Preparatory schools in Pennsylvania
Educational institutions established in 1851
Co-educational boarding schools
Schools in Montgomery County, Pennsylvania
1851 establishments in Pennsylvania
Historic districts on the National Register of Historic Places in Pennsylvania